Konstantin Vladimirovich Kravchuk (born 23 February 1985) is a Russian professional tennis player. He is known for his strong serve and good skills on fast and indoor courts.

Personal life
Kravchuk was born in Moscow to Vladimir, a chief of security, and Irina, a psychologist. He started playing tennis at age five. His mother played amateur tennis and it was her dream that the son become a professional tennis player.

Kravchuk married Veronika, a fashion model, on 12 February 2011; the couple have a daughter, Eva.

Career
In 2013 at age 28 Kravchuk made his debut at the Davis Cup in the 2013 Davis Cup Europe/Africa Zone Group I Second round play-off match against South Africa. In the third rubber, he partnered with Andrey Kuznetsov and defeated Raven Klaasen and Tucker Vorster in four sets. Kravchuk also took part in the fifth dead rubber against Jacob Coenraad de Klerk, who retired during the first set of the match.

After his debut Kravchuk took part in all matches in the Davis Cup until the 2017 season. He played all the doubles matches partnering with five different teammates.

Challenger and Futures/World Tennis Tour finals

Singles: 29 (12–17)

Doubles: 48 (24 titles, 24 runners-up)

National representation

Davis Cup (10–7)

   indicates the outcome of the Davis Cup match followed by the score, date, place of event, the zonal classification and its phase, and the court surface.

ATP Cup (2–1)

References

External links

 
 
 

1985 births
Living people
Russian male tennis players
Universiade medalists in tennis
Universiade silver medalists for Russia
Universiade bronze medalists for Russia
Medalists at the 2013 Summer Universiade
Tennis players from Moscow